Marunouchi Station is the name of several railway stations in Japan:

 Marunouchi Station (Kiyosu) in Kiyosu, Aichi on the Nagoya Railroad Nagoya Main Line
 Marunouchi Station (Nagoya) in Naka-ku, Nagoya, Aichi on the Nagoya Municipal Subway Tsurumai Line and Sakuradōri Line
 Marunouchi Station (Toyama) in Toyama, Toyama